Valery Ushkov (born 30 December 1971) is a Russian sailor. He competed in the Tornado event at the 2004 Summer Olympics.

References

External links
 

1971 births
Living people
Russian male sailors (sport)
Olympic sailors of Russia
Sailors at the 2004 Summer Olympics – Tornado
Sportspeople from Moscow